Marko Simeunovič (born 6 December 1967) is a former Slovenian footballer who played as a goalkeeper. He represented his country at two major tournaments, Euro 2000 and the 2002 FIFA World Cup.

Club career
He started his football career at his home club NK Maribor. As a youngster he moved to Red Star Belgrade, where he didn't get opportunity. After being a substitute against Bayern Munich in semi-final second leg of the 1990–91 European Cup, he moved to Olimpija Ljubljana. He won four consecutive Slovenian Championships and two Slovenian Cups in Ljubljana. In season 1996–97 he won double (Championship and Cup) with NK Maribor. After a short spell at Şekerspor he won three consecutive Slovenian Championships with Maribor. Later, he played for Olympiakos Nicosia, AEL Limassol and Interblock.

Simeunovič holds the record for the most expensive 38-year-old player of all time.

International career
Simeunovič was capped 57 times for Slovenia and was a participant at the Euro 2000 and World Cup 2002. He made his international debut on 3 June 1992 in the first official international match of Slovenia, a 1–1 international friendly with Estonia in Tallinn.

Personal
He is the son of former NK Maribor player and coach, Vojislav Simeunović.

Honours

Olimpija Ljubljana
Slovenian Championship: 1991–92, 1992–93, 1993–94, 1994–95
Slovenian Cup: 1992–93, 1995–96

Maribor
Slovenian Championship: 1996–97, 1999–2000, 2000–01, 2001–02
Slovenian Cup: 1996–97

See also
Slovenian international players
NK Maribor players

References

External links
Player profile at NZS 

1967 births
Living people
Slovenian people of Serbian descent
Sportspeople from Maribor
Yugoslav footballers
Slovenian footballers
Association football goalkeepers
Slovenian expatriate footballers
AEL Limassol players
Olympiakos Nicosia players
Red Star Belgrade footballers
FK Napredak Kruševac players
Slovenian PrvaLiga players
NK Maribor players
NK Olimpija Ljubljana (1945–2005) players
Slovenian expatriate sportspeople in Turkey
Slovenian expatriate sportspeople in Cyprus
Yugoslav First League players
Süper Lig players
Cypriot First Division players
Expatriate footballers in Turkey
Expatriate footballers in Cyprus
Turanspor footballers
UEFA Euro 2000 players
2002 FIFA World Cup players
Slovenia international footballers